Herman Beysens (born 27 May 1950) is a former Belgian racing cyclist. He rode in seven editions of the Tour de France between 1972 and 1981.

References

External links

1950 births
Living people
Belgian male cyclists
Cyclists from Antwerp